Homa Bay is a town (and eponymous bay) on the south shore of Winam Gulf of Lake Victoria, in western Kenya. It lies near Mount Homa (in the Luo language Got Marahuma or God Uma ["famous mountain"]) and Ruma National Park, the latter noted for Jackson's hartebeests and roan antelope (the government has also released reticulated giraffes into the park).

Homa Bay was once the District Headquarters for all of South Nyanza District, Nyanza Province, but has now been divided into at least three districts. Homa Bay is now capital of Homa Bay County per the new constitution. The town of Homa Bay hosts a Municipal Council. The municipality has a population of 44,949 in 2019.

Homa Bay municipality has six wards: Central, Kalanya, Kanyabala, Kanyadier/Kothidha, Katuma and Posta/Bonde. All of them belong to Rangwe Constituency, which has a total of fourteen wards. The remaining eight are located within Homa Bay County Council, the rural council of Homa Bay District.

See also
Kanjera South (paleontological site)

References

External links

 Official site

Homa Bay County
Populated places in Nyanza Province
Populated places on Lake Victoria
County capitals in Kenya